Edwin Alejandro Borboa Pérez (born 11 January 1983) is a Mexican former professional footballer who played as a forward for La Máquina of the United Premier Soccer League.

He previously played for Indios de Ciudad Juarez, Atlante UTN (the filial team of Atlante), Pachuca and Dorados de Sinaloa.

He started his career with C.D. Guadalajara.

Honours
Guadalajara
Mexican Primera División: Apertura 2006

Atlante
Mexican Primera División: Apertura 2007

Notes

References

External links

1983 births
Living people
Sportspeople from Los Mochis
Footballers from Sinaloa
Association football forwards
Mexican footballers
C.D. Guadalajara footballers
Atlante F.C. footballers
Club León footballers
C.F. Pachuca players
Dorados de Sinaloa footballers
Indios de Ciudad Juárez footballers
Leones Negros UdeG footballers
Lobos BUAP footballers